Jean-François Garneray (1755 in Paris – 11 June 1837 in Auteuil) was a French painter. He was a student of Jacques-Louis David.

Children
His three sons were:
 Ambroise Louis Garneray (1783–1857), sea painter
 Auguste-Siméon Garneray (1785–1824), troubadour style painter
 Hippolyte Jean-Baptiste Garneray (1787–1858), painter

Selected works

 The grand Dauphin visits a hut, led by the Duc de Montausier - oil on canvas, 113 by 147.6, signed and dated aged 72 years, exhibited at the 1827 Paris Salon with the caption He took advantage of the emotion which caused the young prince to show unaccustomed attention to the misery reigning in this poor man's house, in order to dispose his soul to pity for them and to relieve them for one day, sold for 95,000 euros by the Hampel auction house in Munich on 16 June 2010 as lot 350
Portrait of Jean-Baptiste Milhaud (Musée du Louvre) - this was long attributed to Garneray's teacher David, due to a dedication reading Au conventionnel Milhaud, son collègue, David-1793 (To the Convention-member Milhaud, his colleague David-1793), but in 1945 Gaston Brière reattributed it to Garneray. A miniature portrait of the same subject, 9 cm in diameter and signed Garneray Ventôse, l'An 2 de la République française (Year 2 of the French Republic), confirmed this attribution.

Notes

1755 births
1837 deaths
18th-century French painters
French male painters
19th-century French painters
19th-century French male artists
18th-century French male artists